Season 2005–06 was the 122nd football season in which Dumbarton competed at a Scottish national level, entering the Scottish Football League for the 100th time, the Scottish Cup for the 111th time, the Scottish League Cup for the 59th time and the Scottish Challenge Cup for the 15th time.

Overview 
Paul Martin's first full season in charge was not to be a happy one.  The league campaign did not start well with only 1 win recorded from the first 9 matches.  There was a temporary improvement in results from mid October to mid November, but thereafter success was hard to come by, and from February onwards just 2 draws were salvaged from 13 league encounters, meaning that Dumbarton would be anchored at the bottom of the table and relegation was assured long before the season's end.  It also meant the end of Paul Martin's tenure in the manager's seat.

In the Scottish Cup, a first round win over Highland League opponents Forres Mechanics was followed by an embarrassing defeat to Third Division Arbroath.

In the League Cup, it was another first round exit, this time to Hamilton.

Finally, in the Scottish Challenge Cup, Dumbarton's dismal record in this competition was extended by a further year with a second round defeat to Raith Rovers.

Locally, in the Stirlingshire Cup, Dumbarton lost both of their opening group ties, and failed to score too.

Despite the disappointing end, the season had in fact started brightly with an invite to the pre-season Keyline Tournament run by Oban Saints. This was duly won, with 3 wins and 2 draws from 5 matches, against strong opposition including Hearts, Dundee United and St Johnstone.

Results & fixtures

Scottish Second Division

CIS League Cup

Bell's League Challenge Cup

Scottish Cup

Stirlingshire Cup

Pre-season friendlies

League table

Player statistics

Squad 

|}

Transfers

Players in

Players out

Trivia
 The League match against Peterhead on 29 October marked Iain Russell's 100th appearance for Dumbarton in all national competitions - the 128th Dumbarton player to reach this milestone.

See also
 2005–06 in Scottish football

References

External links
John Wight (Dumbarton Football Club Historical Archive) 
Gary McDevitt (Dumbarton Football Club Historical Archive)
Paul Young (Dumbarton Football Club Historical Archive)
Kevin MacDonald (Dumbarton Football Club Historical Archive)
Scottish Football Historical Archive
2005 Keyline Tournament

Dumbarton F.C. seasons
Scottish football clubs 2005–06 season